San Sebastián Airport  is an airport in the north of Tierra del Fuego in the Magallanes y Antártica Chilena Region of Chile.

Tierra del Fuego is the large island at the southern tip of South America, separated from the continent by the Strait of Magellan.

See also

Transport in Chile
List of airports in Chile

References

External links
OpenStreetMap - San Sebastián
OurAirports - San Sebastián
FallingRain - San Sebastián Airport

Airports in Chile
Airports in Tierra del Fuego Province, Chile